Natrinema versiforme is an extremely halophilic archaeon. It is neutrophilic, non-motile and pleomorphic, with type strain XF10T (=JCM 10478T =AS 1.2365T =ANMR 0149T).

References

Further reading

External links

LPSN
Type strain of Natrinema versiforme at BacDive -  the Bacterial Diversity Metadatabase

Euryarchaeota
Archaea described in 2000